The Selma Jeanne Cohen Award is a writing award offered by the Dance Studies Association (DSA) for the best graduate student paper submission to the annual conference. Prior to the DSA's foundation in 2017, the award was sponsored by the Society of Dance History Scholars. The award was established in 1995 to honor Selma Jeanne Cohen's contributions to the field of dance history, and to encourage and recognize exemplary scholarship among students researching dance. The award includes a travel grant and registration fee waiver for the annual conference.

Award winners
2018 - Natalia Duong, “Agent Orange Ecologies: Choreographing Kinship in Rhizophora”
  2018 - Sammy Roth, “Reproducing the Foreclosed White Body: Racial Imaginary and White Womanhood in  Competition Dance”
 2018 - Jessica Friedman, ”Josephine Baker’s Decolonial Corporeal Borderland”
 2016 - Jennifer Aubrecht, “Rethinking Appropriation: The Reciprocal Relationship of Yoga and American Modern Dance”
 2015 - Naomi Bragin, “Global Street Dance and Libidinal Economy”
 2015 - Brianna Figueroa, “Economies of The Flesh: Scripting Puerto Rican Colonial History Through Dance”
 2014 - Melissa Melpignano, “Dancing Texts: Writing the Presence of the Dancing Bodies in Dance Librettos”
 2014 - Anne Vermeyden, “The Reda Folk Dance Company and Egyptian Cultural Nationalism: Writing Dance as History”
 2014 Katja Vaghi, “Deixis on Dance: Locating the Audience’s Experience in Time, Space, and Persona”
 2013 - Rachel Carrico, “On the Street and in the Studio: Decentering and Recentering Dance in the New Orleans Second Line”
 2013 - Sinibaldo De Rosa, “Samah: Kardeşlik Töreni — A Dynamic Bodily Archive For The Alevi Semah”
 2013 - Mique’l Dangeli, “Dancing Our Politics: Contemporary Issues in Northwest Coast First Nations Dance”
 2013 (Honorable Mention) - Priya Thomas, “Remote Choreography and the Ghost”
 2013 - Kelly Klein, “Ecological Consciousness through Somatic Practice in Community-Based Performance: Palissimo’s ‘Bastard’”
 2013 - Suparna Banerjee, “I and digi-I: reading the ‘digital double’ in the contemporary Bharatanatyam choreographies”
 2013 - Jingqiu Guan, “The Protesting Arabesque”
 2012 – Amanda Graham, “Out of Site, Trisha Brown’s Roof Piece”
 2012 – Jessica Ray Herzogenrath, “Building National Character: Urbanization, Americanization and Folk Dance in Chicago, 1890-1940”
 2012 – Munjulika Rahman, “Dancing in the (Socialist) City: Bangladesh at the 1979 International Folk in Zagreb”
 2011 – Daniel Callahan, “Absolutely Unmanly: The Music Visualizations of Ted Shawn and His Men Dancers”
 2011 (Honorable Mention) - Virginia Preston, “Fire in the Soul: Claude de l’Estoile’s ballet de cour, Episodic Composition and the Radical Erotics of Globalization”
 2010 - No prize awarded.
 2009 - Anusha Kedhar, "The Specter of the Devadasi: Bharata Natyam and Indian Ethnicity in the U.S."
 2009 - Hannah Kosstrin, "Of Dreams and Prayers: Topographies of Anna Sokolow's Holocaust Work During and After World War II"
 2008 - Elizabeth Arden Thomas, "Moving Forward by Being Still: Anna Halprin's Still Dance with Nature"
 2008 - Victoria Phillips Geduld, "Cultural Diplomacy and the Construction of Empire: Martha Graham's Appalachian Spring and the State Department Tour of 1955-1956"
 2008 - Victoria Fortuna, "Decelerating Movement: The Identity Politics of Time and Space in Rudy Perez's Countdown"
 2007 - Clare Croft, "Photographs and Dancing Bodies: Alvin Ailey's 1967 US State Department Sponsored Tour of Africa"
 2007 - Samuel N. Dorf, "'Greek' Desires in Paris: Isadora Duncan Dances Antiquity in the Lesbian Salon"
 2007 - Sydney Hutchinson, "When Women Lead: Changing Gender Roles in the New York Salsa Scene"
 2006 - No prize awarded.
 2005 - Juliet Bellow, "Picasso's Puppets: Petrouchka, Pierrot and Parade"
 2005 - Öykü Potuoglu-Cook, "From Backstage to Back Streets: An Urban Ethnography of the Post-1980s Turkish Belly Dance"
 2004 - Danielle Robinson, "Invisible Men: The Professionalization of Black Dance Teaching in Jazz Age Manhattan"
 2004 - Emily Winerock, "Dance References in the Records of Early English Drama: Alternative Sources for Non-Courtly Dancing, 1500-1650"
 2003 - Yvonne Hardt, "Relational Movement Patterns: Movement Choirs and their Social Potential in the Weimar Republic"
 2002 - Victoria Watts, "How Do Dances Make Us Laugh?: A Comparative Analysis of the Joking Structure at Play in Tere O'Connor's Hi Everybody! (1999) and Twyla Tharp's Push Comes to Shove (1976)"
 2001 - Jonathan David Jackson, "Gender Representation in the Latest Form of the Black/Latino(a) Sexual Minority Dance Called 'Voguing'"
 2000 - Martin Hargreaves, "Haunted by Failure, Doomed by Success: Melancholic Masculinity in AMP’s Swan Lake"
 1999 - Virginia Taylor, "Respect, Antipathy, and Tenderness: Why Do Girls 'Go to Ballet'?"
 1999 - Anthea Kraut, "The Vernacular Transformations of Black Female Choreographers: Josephine Baker, Zora Neale Hurston, and Katherine Dunham"
 1998 - Janet O'Shea, "Unbalancing the Authentic/Partnering Tradition: Shobana Jeyasingh’s Romance... with Footnotes"
 1997 - Michelle Heffner, "Blood Wedding: Tradition and Innovation in Contemporary Flamenco"
 1997 - Karen A. Mozingo, "Fractured Images: Montage and Gender in Pina Bausch's Tanztheater"
 1996 - Ananya Chatterjea, "The Choreography of Chandralekha"
 1996 - Julia L. Foulkes, "Feminists, in a Way: How Women Shaped Modern Dance"
 1996 - Barbejoy A. Ponzio, "Mythic Images of the West and the Renewed Popularity of Country Dance"
 1995 - Constance Valis Hill, "From Bharata Natyam to Jive: Jack Cole's 'Modern' Jazz Dance" [See Jack Cole (choreographer).]
 1995 - Maribeth Clark, "The Contredanse, That Musical Plague"

Notes and references

External links
 Selma Jeanne Cohen Award - submission information and past recipients
 Dance Studies Association Awards
 Dance Studies Association

Dance awards
Awards established in 1995
Student awards